English national team may refer to:

English cricket team
England national football team
England national rugby league team
England national rugby union team